Titi is a town in western Congo.  It is near the border with Gabon.

Transport 

It is located a short distance from a station on a branchline of the national railway system.

See also 

 Railway stations in Congo

References 

Populated places in the Republic of the Congo